The 1985–86 NCAA football bowl games were a series of post-season games played in December 1985 and January 1986 to end the 1985 NCAA Division I-A football season. A total of 18 team-competitive games, and two all-star games, were played. The post-season began with the California Bowl on December 14, 1985, and concluded on January 18, 1986, with the season-ending Senior Bowl.

Schedule

References